Bogskär is a small group of Baltic Sea islets off the southernmost tip of Finland. It is Finland's southernmost land and governed by the municipality of Kökar in Åland.

Bogskär is so remote that it is located outside the internal waters of Finland, and has its own, separate internal waters. Up to 1995, even its territorial waters were separate from the rest of Finland.

See also
Bogskär Lighthouse

References

Landforms of Åland
Finnish islands in the Baltic